Chausala is a small City in Beed district in Marathwada division in the  Maharashtra state in India. It is located near the National HighWay 52 . This village is politically very active. Its Coordinates are: 18.708692N   75.691595E . 

Before the delimitation of constituency in 2008, Adyar was constituency number 2004 of Maharashtra Legislative Assembly between 1977–2004.

References

Cities and towns in Beed district